Khristianovich Institute of Theoretical and Applied Mechanics of the Siberian Branch of the RAS, ITAM SB RAS is a research institute in Akademgorodok of Novosibirsk, Russia. It was founded in 1957.

History
The institute was founded by Sergey Khristianovich in 1957, he also became its first director.

In 1957, the institute was located within the territory of SibNIA, where it was engaged in the creation of a supersonic wind tunnel until 1960.

In 1991, the International Center for Aerophysical Research (ICAR) was established at the institute.

In 1997, the institute became a member of the International Supersonic Tunnel Association (STAI).

In 2005, the institute was named after Sergey Khristianovich.

Scientific activity
The main directions of scientific research are physical-chemical mechanics, aerogasdynamics, mathematical modeling in mechanics, mechanics of rigid body, deformations and destructions.

Magazines
 Combustion, Explosion, and Shock Waves (together with the SB RAS, LIH SB RAS, ICKC SB RAS)
 Prikladnaya Mekhanika i Tekhnicheskaya Fizika (together with the SB RAS, LIH SB RAS)
 Teplofizika i Aeromekhanika (together with the SB RAS, IT SB RAS)
 Fizicheskaya Mezomekhanika (together with the SB RAS, ISPMS SB RAS)

Notable employees
 Vladimir Aniskin is a miniature sculptor, Senior Researcher at the ITAM SB RAS, Guinness World Record Holder.

Branches
 Tyumen Division of Khristianovich Institute of Theoretical and Applied Mechanics of the Siberian Branch of the RAS
 Pilot Plant, it is located in ObGES Microdistrict of Novosibirsk

Bibliography

References

Research institutes in Novosibirsk
Research institutes established in 1957
Mechanical engineering organizations
Aerospace engineering organizations
Sovetsky District, Novosibirsk
Research institutes in the Soviet Union
1957 establishments in the Soviet Union